Tin is a metallic chemical element with symbol Sn and atomic number 50.

Tin may also refer to:

Science and technology
 Titanium nitride (TiN), an extremely hard ceramic compound
 Tin (newsreader), a software application to read Usenet newsgroups on Unix operating systems

Metallurgy
 Tin or tin can, a sealed tinplate container
 Tin box, an openable tinplate container

Arts and entertainment
 Tins (film), a 2007 film
 The Tins, an American indie rock band
 Tin, a member of the Metal Men superheroes

Other uses
 Tin, Iran (disambiguation), several places
 Tin, a metal area of the wall in a squash court

See also
 
 
 TIN (disambiguation)
 Tinn (disambiguation)
 Tinne (disambiguation)
 At-Tin, the 95th sura of the Qur'an
 Tintin (disambiguation), including Tin Tin